Carrara is a city and comune in Tuscany, in central Italy, of the province of Massa and Carrara, and notable for the white or blue-grey marble quarried there. Its motto is Fortitudo mea in rota (Latin: "My strength is in the wheel").

Toponymy
The word Carrara likely comes from the pre-Roman (Celtic or Ligurian) element kar (stone), through Latin carrariae meaning 'quarries'.

History 

There were known settlements in the area as early as the ninth century BC, when the Apuan Ligures lived in the region. The current town originated from the borough built to house workers in the marble quarries created by the Romans after their conquest of Liguria in the early second century BC. Carrara has been linked with the process of quarrying and carving marble since the Roman Age. Marble was exported from the nearby harbour of Luni at the mouth of the river Magra.

In the early Middle Ages it was a Byzantine and then Lombard possession, and then, it was under the Bishops of Luni who started to write the city's history when the Emperor Otto I gave it to them. It turned itself into a city-state in the early 13th century; during the struggle between Guelphs and Ghibellines, Carrara usually belonged to the latter party. The Bishops acquired it again in 1230, their rule ending in 1313, when the city was given in succession to the Republics of Pisa, Lucca and Florence. Later it was acquired by Gian Galeazzo Visconti of Milan.
 
After the death of Filippo Maria Visconti of Milan in 1447, Carrara was fought over by Tommaso Campofregoso, lord of Sarzana, and again the Malaspina family, who moved here the seat of their signoria in the second half of the 15th century. Carrara and Massa formed the Duchy of Massa and Carrara from the 15th to the 19th century. Under the last Malaspina, Maria Teresa, who had married Ercole III d'Este, it became part of the Duchy of Modena.

After the short Napoleonic rule of Elisa Bonaparte, it was given back to Modena. During the unification of Italy age, Carrara was the seat of a popular revolt led by Domenico Cucchiari, and was a center of Giuseppe Mazzini's revolutionary activity.

At the end of the 19th century Carrara became the cradle of anarchism in Italy, in particular among the quarry workers. The quarry workers, including the stone carvers, had radical beliefs that set them apart from others. Ideas from outside the city began to influence the Carrarese. Anarchism and general radicalism became part of the heritage of the stone carvers. According to a New York Times article of 1894 many violent revolutionists who had been expelled from Belgium and Switzerland went to Carrara in 1885 and founded the first anarchist group in Italy. Carrara has remained a continuous 'hotbed' of anarchism in Italy, with several organizations located openly in the city. The Anarchist marble workers were also the driving force behind organising labour in the quarries and in the carving sheds. They were also the main protagonists of the Lunigiana revolt in January 1894.

In 1929, the municipalities of Carrara, Massa and Montignoso were merged in a single municipality, called Apuania. In 1945 the previous situation was restored.

Carrara is the birthplace of the International Federation of Anarchists (IFA), formed in 1968.

Title 
As a titular Duke of Modena, the current holder of the title of "Prince of Carrara" would be Prince Lorenz of Belgium, Archduke of Austria-Este.

Economy 
Carrara marble has been used since the time of Ancient Rome. The Pantheon and Trajan's Column in Rome are constructed of it, and many sculptures of the Renaissance were carved from it.

Culture 
In addition to the marble quarries, the city has academies of sculpture and fine arts and a museum of statuary and antiquities, and a yearly marble technology fair. The local marble is exported around the world, and marble from elsewhere is also fashioned and sculpted commercially here.

Main sights 
Cathedral (Duomo, 12th century).
Ducal Palace (also Palazzo Cybo Malaspina, 16th century), now the seat of the Fine Arts Academy. Built over pre-existing Lombard fortification, it dates to the reign of Guglielmo Malaspina, becoming in 1448 the permanent seat of the dynasty. It includes two distinct edifices: the Castello Malaspiniano, dating to the 13th century, and the Renaissance palace, begun by Alberico I in the late 16th century. Under the medieval loggia are exposed several ancient Roman findings.
Baroque church and convent of San Francesco, built in 1623–64 by order of Carlo I Cybo-Malaspina.
Church of the Suffragio, begun in 1686 under design of Innocenzo Bergamini, and refurbished in the 19th century. The façade has a large marble portal in Baroque style, sculpted by Carlo Finelli and surmounted by a bas-relief with the "Madonna and the Souls of the Purgatory".
Palazzo Cybo-Malaspina
Sanctuary of the Madonna delle Grazie alla Lugnola, consecrated in 1676 and designed by Alessandro Bergamini.
Church of Santa Maria Assunta, at Torano. It has a 16th-century façade with a portal from 1554. The interior is on a nave and two aisles.

Sister cities

Carrara is twinned with:

 Grasse, France
 Ingolstadt, Germany
 Kragujevac, Serbia
 Opole, Poland
 Yerevan, Armenia
 Yunfu, China

Notable people 
 Eumone Baratta (1823~After 1890), sculptor
 Federico Bernardeschi (1994-), footballer 
 Gianluigi Buffon (1978-), footballer
 Giorgio Chinaglia (1947-2012), footballer
 Francesco Gabbani (1982-), singer
 Lorenzo Musetti (2002-), tennis player
 Pietro Tacca (1577-1640), sculptor
 Cristiano Zanetti (1977-), former footballer
 Carlo Bergamini (1868-1934), sculptor

See also 
 No Cav
 Carrara marble
 Marmifera di Carrara railway

References

External links 

 
Marble Quarry in the Massa and Carrara region
"Carrara" (Marble), in The Monumental News Magazine, March 1893, pp. 273-275.
"The Carrara Marble Industry," Scientific American Supplement, May 17, 1902, pp. 22045–22046.
"A Marble World" (Carrara, Italy), by E. St. John Hart, article in Pearson's Magazine, February 1903
Landsat 7 photograph of Carrara marble quarries in August 2001
 Overnight in Carrara, Italy - slideshow by The New York Times

 
Cities and towns in Tuscany
Coastal towns in Tuscany
Municipalities of the Province of Massa-Carrara